Dreamworld is a theme park and zoo situated on the Gold Coast in Queensland. It is Australia's biggest theme park with over 40 rides and attractions.

Attractions ranges from thrill rides such as The Claw and Pandamonium to family and kids attractions such as the Dreamworld Express and Sky Voyager. Among the 40+ attractions includes the world's third tallest and fastest drop tower, The Giant Drop and The Gold Coaster, the oldest operating steel roller coaster in Queensland.

The park is made up of several themed lands: Ocean Parade, DreamWorks Experience, ABC Kids World, Tiger Island, Main Street, Gold Rush Country, WhiteWater World and Corroboree. These lands have a collection of rides, animal exhibits, shows, food outlets and merchandise shops.

Dreamworld was known for being the former location of the Australian Big Brother house filmed at the Dreamworld Studios, since the program began in Australia from 2001 to 2014. In December 2006, Dreamworld expanded its offerings by opening WhiteWater World next door.
On several occasions during the year, Dreamworld remains open after dark. This event, known as Park After Dark, includes all of the thrill rides and a children's rides.

History

Construction and opening

In 1974, John Longhurst, the father of the future Australian water-ski champion and two time Bathurst 1000 winner Tony Longhurst, put his dream of building a theme park into practice and purchased  of land beside the Pacific Motorway in Coomera. Longhurst spent two years, working 12-hour days, to excavate what is now known as the Murrissipi River. No expense was spared when Longhurst employed some designers who worked on Disneyland and Walt Disney World to design the park. It was up to a collection of Australian architects to mimic Australian pioneer buildings during construction.

With attractions, Longhurst aimed to satisfy all of the family. Opening day attractions included the IMAX Theatre, a Baldwin Locomotive (now known as the Dreamworld Express), Model T Fords (now known as Vintage Cars), Rocky Hollow Log Ride, Australian Koala Theatre and the Captain Sturt Paddle-wheeler. The theme park was officially opened on 15 December 1981 by the Premier of Queensland of the time, Sir Joh Bjelke-Petersen.

1980s

Since then Dreamworld has constantly evolved adding new rides, themed lands and characters. One year after opening, in 1982, a new themed area, Country Fair was opened. The new themed area featured Thunderbolt which opened as the world's longest steel double loop roller coaster. A new themed area known as Gum Tree Gully also opened.

In 1983, two themed areas were opened. Blue Lagoon water park opened with three water slides and several pools. The second themed area was Village Green. Dreamworld also introduced Belinda Brown as the park's third mascot. In 1984 the park began seven-day trading after two years of only being open Thursday through to Tuesday.

In 1986, a new themed area called Gold Rush Country opened featuring Eureka Mountain Mine Ride and Thunder River Rapids Ride. Gold Rush Country was themed around the Australian gold rushes. The same year, Dreamworld opened the Music Bowl (later became Dreamworld Studios).

In 1987, Koala Country opened and in 1989 the Skylink Chairlift opened.

1990s
 
In 1991, to promote the Australian premiere of The Simpsons on Network Ten from 10 February, Dreamworld welcomed the characters of the American TV series. Guests could meet and greet with them as well as see them in the live stage show The Simpsons: Live on Stage, but the characters only appeared twice daily until 30 June.

In 1993, a Waikiki Wave Super Flip named Wipeout opened as part of the new Ocean Parade themed area. In 1995 Tiger Island opened with the Riverwalk Restaurant (now known as the Billabong BBQ and Buffet) opened.

In 1997, Dreamworld opened a slow boat ride named Creature Cruise which they manufactured themselves in Village Oval. Creature Cruise was operation for only a short time. The park also opened the world's tallest and fastest roller coaster Tower of Terror opened. One year later the Giant Drop, the world's tallest freefall ride, was added to the Dreamworld Tower. Also in 1998, four Bengal Tiger cubs were born: Rama, Taj, Sultan and Sita.

In December 1999, Dreamworld added a variety of kids rides in a new themed area called Kennyland. They took up the northern portion of Village Oval and Creature Cruise was converted from a boat ride into a walk-through attraction.

2000s

In January 2001, the Australian Wildlife Experience opened after the refurbishment and expansion of Koala Country. Later that year in April, Big Brother Australia commenced broadcasting following the redevelopment of Dreamworld's Amphitheatre. In December 2001, the Cyclone opened after its relocation from Luna Park Sydney where it was known as "The Big Dipper". Also in 2001, two new Bengal tigers, Kato and Kaasha, were born in Tiger Island. In 2002, Nickelodeon Central replaced Kennyland and Village Oval to include a wide variety of new and refurbished children's rides.

In 2003, Dreamworld further expanded its wildlife offerings by running after hours "Sunset Safaris". In August 2003, Thunderbolt was closed. It was demolished and sold for scrap metal in March 2004. Dreamworld has retained a section of track and at least one train in the park's back-of-house areas. Later that year in September 2004, The Claw opened in Ocean Parade. On 15 March 2005, the Skylink Chairlift, which provided a link between Gold Rush Country and the Australian Wildlife Experience, closed. It remained standing for several months before the wires were removed. The support poles remain standing to this day. Gum Tree Gully closed to make way for the world's first Wiggles World which opened on 10 September 2005.

In 2006, Ardent Leisure shifted its focus to improving its offerings of water attractions. In April, Blue Lagoon was closed due to its planned replacement by WhiteWater World as a separate gated complex. On 24 June, the FlowRider opened in Ocean Parade. On 7 November, the Eureka Mountain Mine Ride closed and it remained standing until 2018 In 2007, two Sumatran Tiger cubs, Indah and Rahni, were born at Tiger Island. Later that year in September, Mick Doohan's Motocoaster opened after the relocation of the Avis Vintage Cars.

On 20 June 2008, SpongeBob FlyPants opened as part of Nickelodeon Central. On 9 June, Tiger Island welcomed the birth of three Sumatran Tiger cubs: Ndari, Jaya and Shanti.

In the middle of 2008, the final series of Australian Big Brother for the Channel 10 Network was produced leaving the house and studios standing upon completion. In Ocean Parade, V8 Supercars RedLine opened on 26 December near the FlowRider and Cyclone entrance. A few months later, the Vortex was closed and removed to make way for AVPX which opened on 10 April 2009. Almost exactly one year later in April 2010, the Illuminate Light & Laser Spectacular began seasonal operation in Main Street. In September, the Tower of Terror relaunched as the Tower of Terror II featuring a new, reversed car.

In  2009, a Bell 206 helicopter operating joy flights on behalf of Dreamworld crash landed in the carpark near the park's main entry. The pilot and four Taiwanese visitors to the park suffered minor injuries in the crash. The pilot was initially praised for avoiding crowded areas of the park, but it was later revealed the crash was a result of mismanagement which led to the helicopter running out of fuel. Dreamworld has not offered helicopter flights since the accident.

2010s

In late 2010, Dreamworld announced that they would begin celebrating their 30th birthday by holding the Summer Funomenon over the summer school holidays. The IMAX Theatre was renovated to become the Dreamworld Cinema. A roof was constructed over Main Street between the entrances for Ocean Parade and Nickelodeon Central. The Marketplace in Main Street was also upgraded. Also a new tiger cub named Pi (pronounced pie) was born.

In 2011, two separate incidents were reported of handlers at Dreamworld's Tiger Island attraction being bitten by a nine-year-old Bengal Tiger and requiring hospitalisation. The park's life sciences manager said that both incidents would be investigated, and the park reviewed its animal handling procedures.

On 16 February 2011, Ardent Leisure announced plans to have an Easter promotion where lions would be on temporary exhibition from National Zoo & Aquarium who are renovating their facilities; this was later revealed by Dreamworld to be "The Lair". On 7 April 2011, Dreamworld announced that they would be adding a family thrill ride in June and a major thrill ride in September 2011. On 18 May 2011, the family thrill ride was officially announced to be a Zamperla Disk'O called Shockwave within Ocean Parade. The ride opened on 25 June 2011. By the start of the winter holidays on 25 June 2011, Dreamworld's contract with Nickelodeon had been terminated, thus all of the rides in Nickelodeon Central were renamed to a generic kids theme: Kid's World. On 17 September 2011, Dreamworld opened BuzzSaw – a Maurer Söhne SkyLoop roller coaster. The opening of the ride was timed with the renaming of Gold Rush Country to the Town of Gold Rush.

On 10 November 2011, Dreamworld announced a three-stage plan to incorporate DreamWorks Animation films and characters into its theme park at a cost of $10 million. The first phase was the temporary summer show, the DreamWorks Holiday Shrektacular. The second phase was the DreamWorks Experience precinct (the retheming of the existing Kid's World area) which opened on 31 March 2012. The final phase was the development of Kung Fu Panda: Land of Awesomeness. This area opened on 21 December 2012 with the park's eighth thrill ride, Pandamonium. In 2012, Dreamworld also saw the return of Big Brother as well as the addition of the Big Red Boat Ride to Wiggles World.

AVPX closed on 31 March 2013. It was replaced with Zombie Evilution on 13 September 2013. Zombie Evilution originally ran as a temporary scare maze until 14 October. On 18 October, the attraction reopened as a laser skirmish attraction with the same theme and backstory.

On 8 November 2013 the park was evacuated when a bushfire came within close proximity. Everyone in the park was evacuated within an hour. Dreamworld announced via Facebook that the park was not under any immediate threat and that back burning to protect it from any damage had started just outside the Big Brother complex. Later that day, Dreamworld again announced via Facebook that the blaze was under control thanks to firefighters and that the park would re-open as normal the next day.

On 28 April 2014, the Reef Diver closed and was subsequently removed. On 20 September, it was replaced by Tail Spin, a Gerstlauer Sky Fly.

In early 2015, Dreamworld teased that two new big attractions would be coming to the park in 2015. Throughout the early months of the year, rumours circulated as to the reopening of the Eureka Mountain Mine Ride, however these did not eventuate. Zombie Evilution once again reopened as a scare maze in April. On 12 May, Dreamworld announced that Wiggles World would become a shared kids' world based on the characters of the Australian children's television network, ABC Kids. ABC Kids World opened in June. Dreamworld also revealed plans for an extensive motorsport attraction, which was expected to be a new V8 Supercars attraction to either complement or replace V8 Supercars RedLine.
On 26 July, Tiger Cub Kai was born.
On 12 October, The Cyclone was closed for refurbishment as part of the Motorsport Precinct, labelled to open 26 December 2015.

On 25 October, Dreamworld posted new information on their website regarding the Motorsport Precinct. Including that the Cyclone will be renamed "Hot Wheels SideWinder" after Dreamworld entered into a partnership with Hot Wheels. Dreamworld also revealed that the Precinct will feature the Motorsport Museum (Featuring the 30 Peter Brock V8's) as well as six state-of-the-art racing simulators, a new F&B (Food and Beverage) Outlet named Grid Burgers and Sports Bar, as well as a new retail outlet. The Precinct is sponsored by Dunlop, RACQ and Hot Wheels and opened on 26 December 2015.
On 29 November 2015, Two Female Tiger Cubs were born. Later named Akasha and Adira.
On 26 December 2015, The Motorsports Experience, including the Brock Museum, Trackside Merchandise Outlet, Grid Burgers Food and Beverage as well as the Hot Wheels SideWinder opened as advertised.

On 27 January 2016, Zombie Evilution closed to the public and would no longer operate as a laser tag arena, the attraction was still, however, utilised as a scare-maze for special events, such as Screamworld. On 9 February, Dreamworld welcomed two female white tiger cubs from Kagoshima City, in Japan. These two cubs were viewable in a quarantine enclosure located in front of the Zombie Evilution attraction. On 29 February, Tiger Island closed for refurbishment, the tiger cubs were still viewable in a new Tiger Cub Kindy area, located in Ocean Parade. Tiger Island reopened on 18 September 2016 and Cub Kindy was moved back to Tiger Island.

In April 2016 a man fell out of the log ride when he stood up mid-ride; he was then run over by two more logs that passed, suffered cuts to his head and almost drowned. The ride was closed for two days after while it was investigated by Queensland authorities. The ride reopened shortly after. In October 2016, Kelly's Showdown and Jack's Watering Hole were permanently closed after most of the Gold Rush Country was blocked of to the public due to a fatal accident.

In March 2019, Dreamworld announced that Wipeout, the park's oldest thrill ride, would be retired and dismantled, and will not re-open from its maintenance period. It was replaced with a shaded seating space for guests.

At a shareholders conference on 23 August 2019, Ardent Leisure confirmed that the Sky Voyager 'flying theatre' simulator ride would open to the public that day. The $17-million Sky Voyager was built in partnership with Brogent Technologies on the site of the former Dreamworld Cinema. It was originally scheduled to open in late 2018, but was delayed due to issues with design registration. During the conference, Ardent further committed to a $50-million investment in their Dreamworld and WhiteWater World properties over the coming three to five years. A $30-million launched roller coaster built by Mack Rides is scheduled to begin construction in early 2020. The coaster's layout will be based on Europa-Park's Blue Fire coaster. A semi-shuttle multi-launch system will be used; a transfer-track will transport riders to the launch track, where the train is launched forwards, then backwards up a vertical spike, then forwards again to complete the track's layout. The coaster will feature 1,200 m (3,937 ft) of track, a top speed of 105 km/h (65 mph), maximum height of 38 m (124 ft), and four inversions. In addition, the last row of each train will feature backwards-facing spinning cars. The park also confirmed that ABC Kids World will receive a multi-million dollar revamp, with confirmation of a new ride to come and further details to be announced at a later date.

On 22 June 2019, six children were arrested after they burnt down the Big Brother house. The children were found at Coomera railway station shortly after the arson. Two of the children were charged with vandalism. The house was completely destroyed and it was demolished along with the Dreamworld Studios shortly after. The wind that day blew the smoke away from the park so the park didn't need to evacuate and nobody was injured.

Just months after the closure of Wipeout, the park announced on 25 October 2019, that the Tower of Terror ll would cease operation on 3 November of the same year. The park cited "focusing our investment on the future and delivering new, world-class attractions for you to enjoy" as the reason for closing the attraction. The park confirmed that The Giant Drop will continue to operate as normal, with the Tower of Terror II track being removed from the Dreamworld Tower structure over time. The press release also included confirmation that a new thrill ride would be announced sometime in the next year as the park continued forward with their multi-million dollar expansion.

Thunder River Rapids Ride incident 

On 25 October 2016 at 2:20 pm AEST, four people were killed in an incident on the ride, on approach towards the unloading platform. A vacant raft had become stuck and the following raft, carrying four adults and two children, collided with it. The conveyor belt continued to push the second raft onto the front raft causing it to lift up and tip backwards with "persons being variously caught in machinery".  Two passengers were ejected from the raft, while the other two were trapped. The deceased were two women, aged 32 and 42, and two men, aged 35 and 38. A 10-year-old boy and a 12-year-old girl who were on the same raft were able to climb out of the raft and onto platforms nearby once the raft conveyor had been shut down and did not sustain injuries.

On 9 November, Ardent Leisure chief executive Deborah Thomas announced that the ride would be permanently closed and demolished.

2020–present

On 7 February 2020, Dreamworld Management announced that the Rocky Hollow Log Ride had been retired from service after 38 years of operation. The following statement was put out by Dreamworld:

"In order to continue Dreamworld’s journey as Australia’s biggest and best theme park, the Dreamworld team has made the decision to retire the Rocky Hollow Log Ride, which opened 38 years ago on 15 December 1981. Dreamworld guests should be assured that this decision to not reopen the ride following its recent scheduled maintenance has been made to allow us to continue developing new experiences for guests while taking proactive steps to deliver a new generation of rides."

Dreamworld also announced a refurbishment of the Hot Wheels SideWinder coaster (renamed to The Gold Coaster) and an upgrade to ABC Kids World which includes a new ride.

On 22 March 2020, Dreamworld announced that they will temporarily cease operations for both Dreamworld and WhiteWater World due to the ongoing COVID-19 pandemic. Two days later, Dreamworld announced they had donated  of leftover food to OzHarvest. 

Over a month later, roller coaster supports for the new roller coaster announced in August 2019, started arriving at the Dreamworld carpark on 27 April 2020. Roller coaster tracks started arriving on 2 June 2020, however no land works had been done during the parks closure. 

The Play School Art Room was removed from Dreamworld's website and all traces of the attraction were removed with the exception of the online park map on 17 June. 

On 12 August 2020, Dreamworld announced the reopening dates for the park as 16 September 2020. Dreamworld also announced that the majority of the Corroboree area was going to be temporarily closed and that FlowRider and the Big Red Car were going to be permanently closed after 14 years. The park removed indoor seating and reconfigured queue lines to allow for improved social distancing. 

In November 2020, Dreamworld announced the  name for their currently under construction roller coaster. The ride, named Steel Taipan, is a Mack Rides Blue Fire clone with a shuttle launch, vertical twisted spike and spinning rear seat. Steel Taipan officially opened on 15 December 2021.

On 17 July 2021, in an email to pass holders, Dreamworld announced that BuzzSaw would be retired after 31 August 2021. The ride was the 13th attraction to be closed since October 2016.

Dreamworld also announced that the Dreamworld Express would be receiving brand new custom train carriages built by a world-class theme park train manufacturer. The refurbished attraction reopened in July 2022, with a reduced track layout and reversed direction of travel. The train now runs clockwise instead of anti-clockwise, with two stations (Central Park Station and Corroborree Station) instead of four. The previous track loop around the defunct Blue Lagoon site has been removed.

In April 2022, The Giant Drop closed for substantial refurbishment and repainting of the Dreamworld Tower. The attraction is scheduled to reopen on 31 January 2023. On 24 November, Dreamworld announced a rebranding of the DreamWorks Experience and ABC Kids World themed area into Kenny and Belinda's Dreamland and the new Rivertown respectively, with rebranded and refurbished attractions as well as new attractions. These areas are expected to be rebranded from 2023 to 2024.

Park timeline

 1974: Dreamworld's creator, John Longhurst, purchased 58 hectares of land in Coomera 
 1981: a Dreamworld opens to the public with the Captain Sturt Paddlewheeler, IMAX Theatre (later Dreamworld Cinemas), Cannonball Express (now Dreamworld Express), Rocky Hollow Log Ride and Model T Fords (now Vintage Car Adventure)
 1982: Grand Prix, Red Baron (later Dora the Explorer's Sea Planes), Thunderbolt and Zumer (now Puss in Boots Sword Swing) open along with the Country Fair themed area.
 1983: The Blue Lagoon water park opens along with the Village Oval themed area and Avalanche, Bumper Bowl (now Skadoosh Bumper Cars), Carousel (now Shrek's Orge Go-Round), Enterprise (later Reef Diver, Game Site, Little Puff and Roulette (later Stingray)
 1984: 7-day trading began
 1986: Gold Rush Country opens with the Eureka Mountain Mine Ride and Thunder River Rapids Ride along with the Dreamworld Studios
 1987: Koala Country opens along with the Skyline Chairlift
 1991: Dreamworld celebrates 10 years of operation
 1992: Grand Prix is decommissioned 
 1993: Ocean Parade opens with the Wipeout
 1995: Tiger Island themed area opens
 1996: Little Puff is decommissioned 
 1997: Creature Cruise and Tower of Terror (later Tower of Terror II) opens
 1998: The Giant Drop opens
 1999: Kennyland opens with Adventure Trails, Dream Copters (now Dronkey Flyers), Kenny's Cars and Wild Wheels
 2000: Creature Cruise is decommissioned 
 2001: Australian Wildlife Experience (now Dreamworld Corroboree opens along with Cyclone (now The Gold Coaster) and The Mummy Returns scare attraction. Dreamworld celebrates 29 years of operation. Big Brother Australia starts production at the amphitheatre with the house located nearby
 2002: Nickelodeon Central opens with Rugrats Runaway Reptar (now Escape from Madagascar) Wild Thornberry's Rainforest Rampage (now MAD Jungle Jam) and the Slime Bowl (now King Juliens Theatre). Adventure Trails, Kenny's Car, Wild Wheels and a temporary kids Ferris wheel are decommissioned
 2003: The Sunset Safari experience opens. Thunderbolt is decommissioned
 2004: The Claw and Farmyard Friends opens. Fright Night (now Happy Halloween) event is inaugurated 
 2005: Wiggles World (now ABC Kids World) opens with the Big Red Car Ride, Fun Spot (now ABC Kids World Fun Spot) and SS Feathersword (now Giggle and Hoot's Pirate Ship). Gum Tree Gully and Skylink Chair Lift are decommissioned.
 2006: FlowRider and WhiteWater World opens. Eureka Mountain Mine Ride is decommissioned 
 2007: Mick Doohan's Motocoaster (now Motocoaster) opens
 2008: SpongeBob FlyPants (now Gingy's Glider) and V8 Supercars RedLine opens. Big Brother Australia ceases production.
 2009: Vortex was decommissioned and replaced with AVPX. Farmyard Friends was also decommissioned and replaced with the Dreamworld Woolshed
 2010: The IMAX Theatre and Tower of Terror refurbished to become the Dreamworld Cinema and Tower of Terror II respectively. Dora the Explorer's Sea Planes was decommissioned
 2011: As part of Dreamworld's 30th Birthday, BuzzSaw, Shockwave and The Lair opens. Nickelodeon Central is replaced by the Dreamworks Experience themed area
 2012: Avalanche is decommissioned for Pandamonium. Captain Sturt Paddle Wheeler and Stingray were also decommissioned. Big Brother Australia resumes production at the park for the second time.
 2013: AVPX was decommissioned and replaced by Zombie Evilution
 2014: Reef Diver was decommissioned and replaced by Tail Spin. Big Brother Australia ceases production for the second and final time.
 2015: Motorsports Experience opens with Brock's Garage, new V8 Super Car RedLine and Hot Wheels SideWinder (previously Cyclone)
 2016: The Ride Express virtual queueing system is introduced. A man was seriously injured on the Rocky Hollow Log Ride. Four riders were killed on Thunder River Rapids Ride. Thunder River Rapids ride decommissioned
 2017: Tiger Island Up Close Experience opens along with Australia's first LEGO Store. The Park after Dark event was inaugurated 
 2018: Trolls Village opened and Rocky Hollow Log Ride reopened. Zombie Evilution and the Dreamworld Cinema was decommissioned 
 2019: Kickback Cove and Sky Voyager opens. Giggle and Hoot Hop n Hoot, Tower of Terror II, Trolls Village, V8 Supercars RedLine and Wipeout are decommissioned. Winterfest was inaugurated while Happy Halloween returned after 15 years
 2020: Hot Wheels Sidewinder was refurbished and became The Gold Coaster. Big Red Car Ride, FlowRider and Rocky Hollow Log Ride are decommissioned. The park was closed for 6 months due to the COVID-19 pandemic
 2021: BuzzSaw was decommissioned. Steel Taipan opens and Spring Country Fair was inaugurated
 2022: Street Food Festival was inaugurated. The Giant Drop and Dreamworld Express rides refurbished

Events

Dreamworld runs several of annual and special events throughout the year and they also offer private event functions where groups can hire one of the parks event venues during the after hours.

Current events
  Happy Halloween  is an annual halloween event that is held in late October. The event runs after the park hours at night with all the rides and attractions operating. A giant trick or treating event is present along with performances and special food and beverages outlets available.
 Park After Dark  is a night time event that is held several times through the year. The event runs after the park has closed. All rides will be operating along with entertainments and special food and beverages outlets.
 Spring County Fair is an annual spring themed event first inaugurated in 2021. Unlike other events, the event is only held during the day. Farm animals are brought in during the event along with live acoustic music and special food and beverages outlets.
  Street Food Festival  is an annual food event at Dreamworld. The event offers an explosion of taste, scent, and activity, with new food and beverage options in pop-up stalls, food trucks and existing outlets. The menu offers special limited time American and Asian food, as well as delicious treats and exclusive drinks. Special entertainment is also offered during the event.
 Winterfest  is an annual winter themed event first inaugurated in 2019. The event is held during the day and night similar to Park After Dark. All rides and attractions are also operational. In addition, the annual Ice Maze, Toboggan Slide and Ice Skating Rink are also available. There are also special food and beverages outlets through the park.

Park layout

Dreamworld is broken up into a series of themed areas – each with their own collection of rides, shows, attractions and shops. From the entrance (in a clockwise direction) they are: Main Street, Gold Rush Country, Corroboree, ABC Kids World, Tiger Island, DreamWorks Experience and Ocean Parade.

Themed Areas 

Main Street serves as the entrance and midway for the park. It features the central station for the Dreamworld Express as well as the Sky Voyager. There area is mainly made up of food, beverage and retail outlets. There area was extended after the removal of Rivertown, and now currently features the Motocoaster.

Gold Rush Country is located to the left of Main Street. It opened on 11 December 1986 with the Eureka Mountain Mine Ride and the Thunder River Rapids Ride. In 2006, the Eureka Mountain Mine Ride was decommissioned due to safety concerns, it was demolished in 2018. Thunder River Rapids Ride was closed in 2016 following a fatal accident and was also removed. Gold Rush Country also featured the BuzzSaw (a Maurer Söhne SkyLoop roller coaster). The area was extended after it took over Rocky Hollow as a sub-themed area. The area now includes The Giant Drop. The area is also features Steel Taipan, a MACK Rides steel launched roller coaster. 

Rocky Hollow opened with Dreamworld in 1981 featuring the Rocky Hollow Log Ride (Closed 7 February 2020). In 1998, the world's tallest free fall ride, opened in the area. In the early 2010s Rocky Hollow merged with Gold Rush Country. Although merged, the term “Rocky Hollow” is still used for the area. The area today remains a sub-themed area part of Gold Rush Country.

Dreamworld Corroboree is a collection of wildlife attractions divided into several subsections which allow guests to view the animals in their natural habitats. It is a registered zoo with 800 native and barnyard animals located within the Dreamworld grounds. There area is also home to a set of Ford Model T vintage cars which can be driven around a small circuit.

 ABC Kids World is a children's area opened in 2005 (as Wiggles World). The southern part of the area features children's Australian TV series such as Giggle and Hoot, Play School, and Bananas in Pyjamas. 
The northern part of the area (also known as Wiggles World) is based upon the popular Australian children entertainers, The Wiggles. It is aimed at toddlers and young children and features gentle rides and attractions including the Big Red Car Ride and Dorothy's Rosy Tea Cup Ride. It was the first of many Wiggles Worlds to be installed at various theme parks around the world (although it is the only one that remains).

Tiger Island opened in 1995 as one of only two interactive tiger exhibits in the world. The exhibit featured various locations for the tigers to live, swim and play. In 2010, the exhibit is home to 6 Bengal tigers, 6 Sumatran tigers and 2 cougars.

DreamWorks Experience is a section of the park designed specifically for children and tweens. All of the attractions in DreamWorks Experience have been refurbished from their operation as rides in Kid's World and Nickelodeon Central. There area is split up into three areas (Madagascar Madness, Shrek's Faire Faire Away and Kung Fu Panda: Land Of Awesomeness). There area's flagship attractions include the Escape from Madagascar suspended family roller coaster and Pandamonium, one of the park's 7 Thrill Rides. 

Ocean Parade is the largest themed area at Dreamworld in terms of attractions. It features 3 of the 7 Thrill Rides – The Claw, Tail Spin and The Gold Coaster which are within close proximity of each other. Ocean Parade has an Australian beach culture theme with some beach-themed rides scattered around the area including the Shockwave and  formerly the FlowRider. It also features an internal, park-hop entrance to WhiteWater World.

Rides and attractions

Previous attractions

Like all theme parks, attractions are sometimes closed due to age and replaced with more contemporary attractions. Dreamworld has seen this action used a great deal of times, with many attraction closures, replacements and expansions.

Future attractions
Like all theme parks, Dreamworld currently has several of proposed or under construction attractions in order to modernise, expand or replace the current attraction listings.

Food, Beverages and Shopping Outlets
Dreamworld has a large variety when it comes to food, beverages and shopping. Dreamworld has several of food, beverages and shopping outlets located around the park with some shops themed around rides. The following is a list of outlets:

Food & Beverages

Shopping Outlets

Guest features
Dreamworld offers a virtual queuing system called Ride & Slide Express (formerly known as Q4U) that can be used on almost all rides and slides. Ride & Slide Express can be purchased either online or at the Ride Express store. A photo pass is also available for purchase that can save on-ride photos and character photos. Photos from the Corroboree such as the Koala Photos must be purchased separately. Dreamworld also offer a Play Pass card for its Gamesite Arcade. Guests can load funds onto their Play Pass to play any of the arcade machines.

Public transport access
Surfside Buslines provides bus services to/from Coomera railway station and Helensvale railway station via Warner Bros. Movie World and Wet'n'Wild with its TX7 bus service. There are three bus stops located at Dreamworld. Dreamworlds main bus stop is located to the left of the main entrance in front of BuzzSaw. The stop primarily serves the TX7 routes. Another bus stop is located near the main bus stop. The stop primarily serves charter services. A final bus stop is located in front of WhiteWater World. The stop also serves the TX7 route however is mostly used temporarily if the main bus stop is unavailable. Charter busses also serve the stop.

See also

Dreamworld Wildlife Foundation
SkyPoint Observation Deck
WhiteWater World

References

External links
 
 

1981 establishments in Australia
Amusement parks in Queensland
Amusement parks opened in 1981
Ardent Leisure
Buildings and structures on the Gold Coast, Queensland
 Dreamworld
Tourist attractions on the Gold Coast, Queensland
Zoos in Queensland